Evolutionary Ecology is a bimonthly peer-reviewed scientific journal covering the study of ecology from an evolutionary perspective. It was established in 1987 and is published by Springer Science+Business Media. The editor-in-chief is Matthew Symonds (Deakin University). According to the Journal Citation Reports, the journal has a 2017 impact factor of 2.133.

References

External links

Evolutionary ecology
Evolutionary biology journals
Ecology journals
Springer Science+Business Media academic journals
Bimonthly journals
Publications established in 1987
English-language journals